Max Gufler (May 1, 1918 – 1966) was an Austrian serial killer.

During Gufler's childhood he was repeatedly haunted by unpredictable violence as a result of a serious skull injury, which he had suffered at the age of nine years from an incident. During the Second World War, he was again injured as an ambulance driver of the Wehrmacht in frontline operations from shrapnel in his head area. His impaired physical and mental condition might be an explanation for his actions.

Murders 
After the Second World War, Gufler worked in the Lower Austrian town of St. Pölten as a bookseller until he met the daughter of a tobacconist in 1951. In his father-in-law's kiosk, he offered customers banned pornographic photos, eventually leading to his and the kiosk owner's detention.

Barely released from custody, Gufler killed prostitute Emilie Meystrzik, who was found in 1952 with a broken skull in a love hotel in the Viennese red-light district. Gufler, who now worked as a vacuum cleaner representative, developed into a cunning marriage swindler who promised marriage to women and killed them as soon as he had managed to obtain their money. He invited his victims to a honeymoon and then anaesthetisized them with coffee spiked with barbituric acid. He drowned his unconscious victims in lakes to make the crime appear to be a suicide.

Conviction 
After the murder of Maria Robas in September 1958, the evidence against Gufler had accumulated. He was arrested in St. Pölten because of an urgent suspicion of having murdered 18 women since the end of the war. In order to be able to convict him, a new procedure was developed by Viennese forensic doctors at the time, with which two sleep aids could be separated and individually identified.

Although he was charged with seven murders, only four murders and two attempted murders were proven in a jury trial before the Vienna District Court for Criminal Matters. Despite his severe brain trauma, Gufler was sentenced to life imprisonment in May 1961. In 1966, he died at Stein Prison in Krems an der Donau.

Literature

See also 
 List of serial killers by number of victims

External links 

 Spektakuläre Kriminalfälle

1918 births
1946 murders in Austria
1952 murders in Austria
1958 murders in Austria
1966 deaths
Austrian military personnel of World War II
Austrian serial killers
Date of death missing
Male serial killers
Serial killers who died in prison custody
Violence against women in Austria